Kulan may refer to:

 Turkmenian kulan, Equus hemionus kulan, a wild ass
 Kulan, Afghanistan, a village in Badakhshan Province in north-eastern Afghanistan
 Kulan, East Azerbaijan, Iran
 Kulan, Kermanshah, Iran
 Kulan, Kurdistan, Iran
 Kulan, Kumasi, Kurdistan Province, Iran
 Kulan, Lorestan, Iran
 Kulan, Kazakhstan, the capital town of the Turar Ryskulov District
 Kulan Gath, a fictional character in several Marvel comics

See also
 Khulan (disambiguation)